Puti Kaisar-Mihara (born April 28, 1986) is an Austrian martial artist and model of Indonesian origin. Her father Mihar Walk Tan Pangeran (b. 1961) is Minangkabau. Puti Mihara was born in Padang, but moved at the age of three with her father from Indonesia to Vienna, where she grew up. A silat student since the age of 3-4, Mihara holds the honorary title of Pendekar and works as the coach at the Pandeka Mihar Institute in Vienna. She raised to prominence with her leading role in Tatort: Die Kunst des Krieges (2016). Also, she plays a role in the Austrian television series "."

References

External links 

Pendekar Puti Kaisar-Mihara.  (ORF 2)

Austrian people of Indonesian descent
Austrian film actresses
1986 births
Living people
Australian female models
Indonesian female models
People from Padang
Minangkabau people